Okawville Junior/Senior High School is located in Okawville, Illinois.

Athletics
The school's mascot is the Rockets/Lady Rockets.
Sports teams that Okawville offers include Boys'/Girls' Basketball, Boys'/Girls' Golf, Boys' Baseball, Girls' Softball, Track and Field, Cross Country running, and Cheerleading.

External links

Public high schools in Illinois
Schools in Washington County, Illinois